Majestic Part 1: Alien Encounter is a 1995 video game from Piranha Interactive Publishing.

Development
Majestic was developed by Loyola College students Istvan Pely, Stephan Sherban, and Seth Jones. The game was developed with a budget of less than $9,000, financed largely by loans  from parents and the "maxed out" credit cards of the three partners.

Reception

Electric Games gave the game a score of 87% stating "Good storyline. Graphics and sounds are all well-balanced. Answers to riddles could have been found in the game. A little short, but well worth playing"

References

1995 video games
Classic Mac OS games
Point-and-click adventure games
Mystery video games
Video games about extraterrestrial life
Video games set in outer space
Windows games